Panky Trinidad is a Filipina singer. She was one of the scholars of the first season of Pinoy Dream Academy in 2006. In 2008, she was chosen to be one of the representatives to the World Championship of the Performing Arts.

World Championship of Performing Arts
In 2008, Panky was chosen as one of the representatives of the Philippine Team for the World Championship of Performing Arts, where she competed for the senior division. Her awards are as follows:

 GOLD - Female Vocal R&b/soul/Jazz - 18-24
 GOLD - Female Vocal Rock - 18-24
 SILVER - Female Vocal Broadway - 18-24
 BRONZE - Female Vocal Pop - 18-24

and she was cited as the Champion of the World for the Vocal R&B/Soul/Jazz - 16-24 Category.

Discography
Albums / Collaborations

Singles / Theme Songs:
 Umiinit, Umaapoy, Lumiliyab - Dragonna OST

Filmography

Recent
She is now being managed by KB Entertainment, and she looks forward in doing more TV guestings.

Panky Trinidad announced last February 2009 that she will be part of a new band, Version 4.0, as well as plans to perform around Europe in 2009.

References

1986 births
Living people
Pinoy Dream Academy participants
Star Magic
Singers from Cebu City
21st-century Filipino women singers